Orumcekia is a genus of Asian funnel weavers first described by A. Ö. Koçak & M. Kemal in 2008.

Species
 it contains eight species:

Orumcekia gemata (Wang, 1994) – China, Vietnam
Orumcekia jianhuii (Tang & Yin, 2002) – China
Orumcekia lanna (Dankittipakul, Sonthichai & Wang, 2006) – Thailand
Orumcekia libo (Wang, 2003) – China, Vietnam
Orumcekia mangshan (Zhang & Yin, 2001) – China
Orumcekia pseudogemata (Xu & Li, 2007) – China
Orumcekia sigillata (Wang, 1994) – China
Orumcekia subsigillata (Wang, 2003) – China

References

External links

Agelenidae
Araneomorphae genera
Spiders of China